The Arizona–Mexico League was a Minor League Baseball league in the southwestern U.S. and northwestern Mexico, that operated as an affiliated Class C league that existed from 1955–58, and then again in 2003 as an independent baseball league. 
Currently, the Arizona–Mexico League has formed as a legal entity as an independent baseball league that is scheduling to begin play in the future. The league office is in operation, with the goal of beginning play in previous league cities. An exact time to start a new season is unknown at this time.

History 
The Arizona–Mexico League was the successor league of the Arizona-Texas League and Arizona State League. The Arizona–Texas League existed from 1930–32, 1937–41, 1947–50 and 1952-54. From 1928 to 1930, it was known as the Arizona State League.

On February 12, 1955, a league meeting at the Tucson league office was held, with President Tim Cusick presiding.  The league board consisting of seven members were present. The El Paso and Juarez clubs had been released by the eight-team league during the 1954 season, release effective November 1955, and Globe-Miami entered the league in the off-season. With El Paso, the lone Texas franchise no longer in the league, on this date, the league voted to officially change the league name from Arizona-Texas League to Arizona-Mexico League.

League brass were scrambling in early 1955, trying to recruit an eighth team. Not knowing how many teams would be in the league on opening day, league president Tim Cusick drafted a two-part league schedule, a schedule for a seven-team league and one for an eight-team league. Just before the start of the 1955 season Yuma was accepted into the league. Eventual baseball heavyweight promoter Dick King got word that a team operator was needed in Yuma and he quickly arrived to begin the process of putting a team together.

Three of the eight league teams had affiliation with Major League Baseball. Mexicali had a working agreement with St Louis, Phoenix with Baltimore and the recently joined Globe-Miami team signed with Philadelphia.

The 1956 season had one team membership move and that was the Globe-Miami membership relocating to Tijuana. Also, the league trimmed the number of games from 139 in 1955, to a less aggressive 120 in 1956. Yuma found affiliation with the Cincinnati Reds along with the Douglas Copper Kings becoming affiliated with the Pittsburgh Pirates.
Cananea won the first half pennant and Yuma the second half in the split season.

1957 brought a lot of business action. In a January 6, 1957 league meeting held in Nogales, Sonora, Chuck Hollinger of Tucson was elected president of the Arizona–Mexico League and Oliver Talimini of Phoenix, vice president in a general business meeting of league officials. Hollinger replaced E. T. (Tim) Cusick who resigned the previous year. It was voted that there would be no split season in 1957 and no playoff series. The members also adopted a 140-game playing schedule which included no doubleheader games although games rescheduled multiple times because of bad weather could have resulted in a doubleheader. A player pool, based on attendance, was also voted in with the top four finishers splitting the profits. The veteran limit of five was retained for this season.

Las Vegas was voted into the league in a league meeting held in Phoenix on February 3, replacing Tijuana which folded the previous season. At the close of the meeting the league had eight teams for the upcoming season. In other actions at the meeting, the league voted to abolish the job of executive secretary and to raise the salary of League President Charles Hollinger of Tucson from $2,400 to $3,200 a year. Hollinger, who was the former league executive secretary, will combine duties of the secretary with his post as league President. He also was selected to handle the job of league statistician, held for several years by William J. Weiss of San Mateo, Calif.

In mid-March, from the league office in Tucson it became clear only six weeks from opening day that the league will "open and finish the 1957 season with six teams", according to President Chuck Hollinger. Douglas, Las Vegas, Tucson, Phoenix and the two Mexican entries, Mexicali and Cananea. The league lineup is two short of last season, which included Yuma, Tijuana and Nogales. Nogales and Tijuana had financial difficulties and Yuma had problems in securing the municipal ball park after leaving a $3,000 debt after the previous season. The three teams dropping from the league along with the Las Vegas addition, the league sat at six teams by the start of the season. Hollinger also said the league will open April 26, and have a late closing date of September 15. The president said the schedule will have teams playing in each city five times during the summer with three games as the maximum series. No doubleheaders are included in the schedule, but may be played if there are multiple rain-outs during the season.
The number of working agreements decreased to two teams, Phoenix with the Baltimore Orioles and Douglas with the Pittsburgh Pirates. With the Yuma and Mexicali departure from the league, so did two affiliations.

In an early January 1958 league meeting held at Nogales, Sonora, the league held discussions of what the best interest of the league would be concerning keeping more rookies on team rosters in order to receive more Major League help. Four teams attended the meeting along with several new cities attending whom expressed interest in joining the '58 season. Also, the league voted to retain Charles Hollinger as president and elected the Douglas club president, Curtis Page, as Arizona–Mexico League vice-president.

A league meeting was called at the Tucson league headquarters on March 2, and the league's current four teams, Tucson, Douglas, Mexicali, and a combined Cananea-Nogales team voted not to continue unless two more teams could be found to enter the league. The league postponed to the next league meeting that was held in Douglas, Arizona March 30. The Central Mexican League disbanded over the off-season and Juarez attended the meeting. The league voted unanimously to accept the Juarez team and asked them to help with communications with Chihuahua about bringing their team to be the sixth much needed team into the league for 1958.

At the April 13th special called league meeting held in El Paso, Texas, Chihuahua team officials traveled to attend in order to gain the league vote for their team to enter the league as the 6th and final team. The league board voted to accept Chihuahua, they also voted to have a 120-game season, begin play May 1 and close Sept. 7. Chihuahua would play some of it home games at Las Delicias in the state of Chihuahua and Douglas planned to schedule some of its home games at Agua Prieta in Sonera, Mex.

Two weeks before the start of the season, it was announced that the Nogales-Cananea franchise will operate solely from Nogales that year. League president Chuck Hollinger made the announcement after talking by telephone to Cananea officials who had conferred earlier in the day with Carlos de la Isla of Nogales. For the past several seasons Cananea had been leading the league in attendance but the previous year, due to the drop in copper prices in the mining city, the club had trouble making ends meet. At the same time the shortest playing schedule since the reactivation of the league in 1947 was released by Hollinger.

In 1958 the Douglas Copper Kings did something no other professional team has done in minor league baseball history. All nine players of the starting line-up hit a home run in the same game at Chihuahua. See the external link below.

In late 1958, Phoenix was granted a Class AAA Pacific Coast League membership as it received the AAA San Francisco Seals club membership as the New York Giants moved to San Francisco.

With the Arizona–Mexico League already at six-teams, losing Phoenix signaled the end of the Class C Arizona–Mexico League; its final champion in 1958 was the Douglas Copper Kings, an affiliate of the Pittsburgh Pirates.

During the four seasons more than 1,700,000 fans went through the gates. The Cananea Mineros were the only team to win more than one league title, taking back to back championships in 1955 and 1956. They drew 347,247 fans those two years.

George Trautman, head of the minor leagues informed league team members, via wire that effective March 23, 1959, the Arizona–Mexico League will fold. Don Jameson, owner of the Tucson Cowboys, received a night wire and $2,100 in deposits which was that years league dues.

2003 league reformed 
On December 21, 2002, a meeting was held by representatives of the Bisbee-Douglas Copper Kings, Cananea Mineros, Juarez Halcones and Nogales Charros. This meeting resulted in the official formation of the Arizona–Mexico League (AZMXL), a league that would fill a void for the rookie year to third year professional player. Team directors were John Guy/Bisbee-Douglas; Abe Erdman/Cananea; Alicia Barboza/Juarez; and Shane Folsom/Nogales.

The 2003 season marked the beginning as an Independent league and each team was scheduled to play 72 games. Opening night was May 30, 2003.

A month prior to the start of the season the Juarez team moved to Tecate, Baja California and became the Tecate Cerveceros. The Juarez home stadium, Estadio Carta Blanca, was to undergo renovations, as agreed between the team and the stadium owner. The renovations had not begun as of 30 days before the beginning of the season, and the league voted to move the team to the next viable city.

The Bisbee-Douglas team notified the league office the morning of June 17, which was an off-day for each team, and requested an emergency meeting held at the Bisbee-Douglas team office. The meeting was held late-afternoon and directors of each team were present. Each team explained the difficulty of operations since the league inception. Bisbee-Douglas explained they had overdrawn at the bank, the primary Nogales shareholder told the meeting they did not want to continue. The directors of the Cananea and Tecate teams said they would try to continue their season. The president of the league, Bob Lipp, called for a vote. Each team agreed to suspend operations and it was a 4-0 vote, each team in favor to stop the season.

The season lasted nearly three weeks and each team played 16 games.

The league's highest profile player was former MLB outfielder Chuck Carr who signed with Bisbee-Douglas as a player-coach on May 7.

Cities Represented 

Bisbee, AZ & Douglas, AZ: Bisbee-Douglas Copper Kings 1955; Douglas Copper Kings 1956–1958; Bisbee-Douglas Copper Kings 2003 
Cananea, Sonora, MEX: Cananea Mineros 1955–1957, 2003 
Chihuahua, Chihuahua, MEX: Chihuahua Dorados 1958 
Ciudad Juarez, Chihuahua, MEX: Juarez Indios 1958 
Globe, AZ & Miami, AZ: Globe-Miami Miners 1955 
Las Vegas, NV: Las Vegas Wranglers 1957 
Mexicali, Baja California, MEX: Mexicali Eagles (or Mexicali Aguilas) 1955–1958 
Nogales, Sonora, MEX: Nogales Yaquis 1955; Nogales Diablos Rojos 1956; Nogales Mineros 1958; Nogales Charros 2003 
Phoenix, AZ: Phoenix Stars 1955–1957
Tecate, Baja California, MEX: Tecate Cerveceros 2003 
Tijuana, Baja California, MEX: Tijuana Potros 1956 
Tucson, AZ: Tucson Cowboys 1955–1958 
Yuma, AZ: Yuma Sun Sox 1955–1956

Arizona–Mexico League Standings 
1955 Arizona–Mexico League
schedule President: Tim Cusick
No Playoffs Scheduled.
1956 Arizona–Mexico League President: Tim Cusick
Tijuana disbanded June 28. Playoffs: Cananea 3 games, Yuma 0.
1957 Arizona–Mexico League 
schedule President: Charles S. Hollinger
Mexicali disbanded September 6 and forfeited 10 remaining games.Playoffs: None Scheduled.
1958 Arizona–Mexico League 
schedule President: Charles S. Hollinger
Playoffs: None Scheduled.
2003 Arizona–Mexico League

Champions

References

External links
Arizona–Mexico League website

Defunct independent baseball leagues in the United States
Baseball leagues in Arizona
Defunct minor baseball leagues in the United States
Sports leagues established in 1955
Sports leagues disestablished in 1958
Sports leagues established in 2003
Sports leagues disestablished in 2003